2020 LD is an Apollo near-Earth asteroid roughly  in diameter. The glare of the Sun had masked the approach of the asteroid since November 2019. The close approach distance is now known with an accuracy of roughly ± 1000 km. This is the largest asteroid to pass closer than the Moon this year and possibly the largest since  in November 2011. The asteroid makes close approaches to Mercury, Venus, Earth, and Mars. It will be brighter than apparent magnitude 24 until 18 July 2020.

With a short 6 day observation arc it was possible that the asteroid had passed  from Earth in June 1918 or would pass  from Venus in April 2024.

With a 11-day observation arc, the Sentry Risk Table lists a 1 in 9 million chance of impact on 7 June 2109.

 is another similarly sized asteroid whose close approach will not be masked by the Sun this year.

Recent 100m asteroids passing inside lunar distance
Very few asteroids have known sizes or shapes. The albedo (how reflective the surface is) of these asteroids is often unknown and therefore only generic assumptions can be made about their sizes. A smaller more reflective asteroid can have the same absolute magnitude (H) of a larger less reflective asteroid.

See also 
 2019 OK
 2018 AH

Notes

References

External links 
 Biggest asteroid to pass close (and undetected) this year
 
 
 

Minor planet object articles (unnumbered)
Discoveries by ATLAS
Potential impact events caused by near-Earth objects
20200605
20200607